The 1988 Stanford Cardinal baseball team represented Stanford University in the 1988 NCAA Division I baseball season. The team was coached by Mark Marquess in his 12th season at Stanford.

The Cardinal won the College World Series, defeating the Arizona State Sun Devils in the championship game.

Roster

Schedule 

! style="background:#990000;color:white;"| Regular Season
|- valign="top" 

|- align="center" bgcolor="#ffdddd"
| January 31 || at  || 2-3 || 0-1 || –
|- align="center" bgcolor="#ddffdd"
| February 1 || Santa Clara || 3-2 || 1-1 || –
|- align="center" bgcolor="#ddffdd"
| February 2 ||  || 13-8 || 2-1 || –
|- align="center" bgcolor="#ffdddd"
| February 5 ||  || 1-5 || 2-2 || –
|- align="center" bgcolor="#ddffdd"
| February 6 || Cal State Fullerton || 9-4 || 3-2 || –
|- align="center" bgcolor="#ffdddd"
| February 7 || Cal State Fullerton || 5-6 || 3-3 || –
|- align="center" bgcolor="#ddffdd"
| February 9 || at  || 4-1 || 4-3 || –
|- align="center" bgcolor="#ddffdd"
| February 12 || at  || 5-0 || 5-3 || –
|- align="center" bgcolor="#ffdddd"
| February 13 || at Hawaii || 4-5 || 5-4 || –
|- align="center" bgcolor="#ffdddd"
| February 14 || at Hawaii || 3-4 || 5-5 || –
|- align="center" bgcolor="#ddffdd"
| February 16 ||  || 12-6 || 6-5 || –
|- align="center" bgcolor="#ddffdd"
| February 17 ||  || 5-3 || 7-5 || –
|- align="center" bgcolor="#ddffdd"
| February 19 ||  || 15-4 || 8-5 || –
|- align="center" bgcolor="#ddffdd"
| February 20 || UC Santa Barbara || 9-8 || 9-5 || –
|- align="center" bgcolor="#ddffdd"
| February 21 || UC Santa Barbara || 13-2 || 10-5 || –
|- align="center" bgcolor="#ddffdd"
| February 22 ||  || 4-1 || 11-5 || –
|- align="center" bgcolor="#ddffdd"
| February 26 || at  || 13-4 || 12-5 || 1–0
|- align="center" bgcolor="#ddffdd"
| February 27 || at Southern California || 7-6 || 13-5 || 2–0
|-

|- align="center" bgcolor="#ddffdd"
| March 1 ||  || 10-9 || 14-5 || –
|- align="center" bgcolor="#ffdddd"
| March 4 ||  || 3-6 || 14-6 || 2–1
|- align="center" bgcolor="#ddffdd"
| March 5 || UCLA || 11-4 || 15-6 || 3–1
|- align="center" bgcolor="#ddffdd"
| March 6 || UCLA || 5-1 || 16-6 || 4–1
|- align="center" bgcolor="#ddffdd"
| March 19 ||  || 5-0 || 17-6 || 5–1
|- align="center" bgcolor="#ddffdd"
| March 20 || Arizona || 8-7 || 18-6 || 6–1
|- align="center" bgcolor="#ddffdd"
| March 21 || Arizona || 5-4 || 19-6 || 7–1
|- align="center" bgcolor="#ffdddd"
| March 22 || at Fresno State || 3-13 || 19-7 || –
|- align="center" bgcolor="#ffdddd"
| March 25 || at Arizona State || 1-9 || 19-8 || 7–2
|- align="center" bgcolor="#ffdddd"
| March 26 || at Arizona State || 10-11 || 19-9 || 7–3
|- align="center" bgcolor="#ffdddd"
| March 27 || at Arizona State || 7-10 || 19-10 || 7–4
|- align="center" bgcolor="#ddffdd"
| March 29 || at Santa Clara || 4-2 || 20-10 || –
|- align="center" bgcolor="#ddffdd"
| March 31 ||  || 3-2 || 21-10 || 8–4
|-

|- align="center" bgcolor="#ffdddd"
| April 1 || at California || 2-3 || 21-11 || 8–5
|- align="center" bgcolor="#ddffdd"
| April 2 || California || 6-5 || 22-11 || 9–5
|- align="center" bgcolor="#ddffdd"
| April 4 ||  || 13-2 || 23-11 || –
|- align="center" bgcolor="#ddffdd"
| April 5 || Santa Clara || 20-3 || 24-11 || –
|- align="center" bgcolor="#ffdddd"
| April 8 || at Arizona || 5-20 || 24-12 || 9–6
|- align="center" bgcolor="#ddffdd"
| April 9 || at Arizona || 10-7 || 25-12 || 10–6
|- align="center" bgcolor="#ffdddd"
| April 10 || at Arizona || 8-9 || 25-13 || 10–7
|- align="center" bgcolor="#ddffdd"
| April 12 || at San Francisco || 17-6 || 26-13 || –
|- align="center" bgcolor="#ffdddd"
| April 15 || at UCLA || 4-9 || 26-14 || 10–8
|- align="center" bgcolor="#ddffdd"
| April 16 || at UCLA || 8-5 || 27-14 || 11–8
|- align="center" bgcolor="#ddffdd"
| April 17 || at UCLA || 5-2 || 28-14 || 12–8
|- align="center" bgcolor="#ddffdd"
| April 18 || at USC || 5-3 || 29-14 || 13–8
|- align="center" bgcolor="#ddffdd"
| April 23 || Arizona State || 5-3 || 30-14 || 14–8
|- align="center" bgcolor="#ffdddd"
| April 24 || Arizona State || 6-15 || 30-15 || 14–9
|- align="center" bgcolor="#ffdddd"
| April 25 || Arizona State || 5-13 || 30-16 || 14–10
|- align="center" bgcolor="#ddffdd"
| April 26 || at San Jose State || 7-3 || 31-16 || –
|- align="center" bgcolor="#ffdddd"
| April 27 || at Fresno State || 5-6 || 31-17 || –
|- align="center" bgcolor="#ffdddd"
| April 29 || at Miami (FL) || 3-9 || 31-18 || –
|- align="center" bgcolor="#ffdddd"
| April 30 || at Miami (FL) || 3-7 || 31-19 || –
|-

|- align="center" bgcolor="#ddffdd"
| May 3 || Pacific || 16-0 || 32-19 || -
|- align="center" bgcolor="#ffdddd"
| May 6 || at California || 3-8 || 32-20 || 14-11
|- align="center" bgcolor="#ddffdd"
| May 7 || California || 13-3 || 33-20 || 15-11
|- align="center" bgcolor="#ffdddd"
| May 8 || at California || 1-4 || 33-21 || 15-12
|- align="center" bgcolor="#ddffdd"
| May 10 || at  || 23-2 || 34-21 || –
|- align="center" bgcolor="#ddffdd"
| May 13 || USC || 10-8 || 35-21 || 16-12
|- align="center" bgcolor="#ddffdd"
| May 14 || USC || 10-9 || 36-21 || 17-12
|- align="center" bgcolor="#ddffdd"
| May 15 || USC || 12-4 || 37-21 || 18-12
|-

|- align="center" bgcolor="#ffdddd"
| May 27 || vs.  || 3-5 || 37-22
|- align="center" bgcolor="#ddffdd"
| May 27 || vs.  || 7-5 || 38-22
|- align="center" bgcolor="#ddffdd"
| May 29 || vs.  || 8-1 || 39-22
|- align="center" bgcolor="#ddffdd"
| May 30 || vs.  || 6-5 || 40-22
|- align="center" bgcolor="#ddffdd"
| May 31 || vs. Kentucky || 16-2 || 41-22
|-

|- align="center" bgcolor="ddffdd"
| June 4 || vs. Fresno State || Rosenblatt Stadium || 10-3 || 42-22
|- align="center" bgcolor="ffdddd"
| June 6 || vs. Cal State Fullerton || Rosenblatt Stadium || 3-5 || 42-23
|- align="center" bgcolor="ddffdd"
| June 7 || vs. Miami (FL) || Rosenblatt Stadium || 2-1 || 43-23
|- align="center" bgcolor="ddffdd"
| June 9 || vs. Cal State Fullerton || Rosenblatt Stadium || 4-1 || 44-23
|- align="center" bgcolor="ddffdd"
| June 10 || vs. Cal State Fullerton || Rosenblatt Stadium || 9-5 || 45-23
|- align="center" bgcolor="ddffdd"
| June 11 || vs. Arizona State || Rosenblatt Stadium || 9-4 || 46-23
|-

Awards and honors 
Troy Paulsen
 First Team All-Pac-10

Lee Plemel
 College World Series Most Outstanding Player

Doug Robbins
 College World Series All-Tournament Team

Ed Sprague
 First Team All-American
 First Team All-Pac-10

Ron Witmeyer
 College World Series All-Tournament Team

Cardinal in the 1988 MLB Draft 
The following members of the Stanford Cardinal baseball program were drafted in the 1988 Major League Baseball draft.

References 

Stanford Cardinal
Stanford Cardinal baseball seasons
NCAA Division I Baseball Championship seasons
College World Series seasons
Stanford Cardinal baseball
Stanford